Chengdu Greenland Tower is a supertall skyscraper currently under construction in Chengdu, Sichuan, China. Construction began in 2014 and was halted in early 2019. In mid 2020, construction started back up. When it is completed, it will become the tallest building in Chengdu and southwestern China.

Architecture and design

Architecture

Conforming with the cascade of skyscraper projects advancing in the city – particularly in the booming Dongcun blends a keen sense of functionalism with a gutsy, emboldened design that is set to rise above the rest. The tower forms a central component of a larger complex, Chengdu Greenland Center, which will consist of: a retail podium, complete with conference center, a bridge connecting to the main tower, and an exhibition hall; two smaller apartment towers of 173 and 166 meters; and the main tower, containing an array of office accommodations and a luxury hotel. The overall design of the complex interprets and integrates Chengdu's urban structure and local culture, representing the modern embodiment of Chinese traditional feng shui theory.

Design
The form of the tower was inspired by the unique ice mountain topography around the city, with an angled, mountainous façade that emulates the cool bluish hue of the rocky formations in deep winter. Like the mountain ridges reflecting the light of the sky and the valleys reflecting light from the earth, the tower will perform as a light sculpture to diffuse light from 360 degrees, creating a connection between the ground plane and the sky. A series of inset LED lights along the exterior will enhance this effect at night, causing the tower itself to be an enduring visual centerpiece for the larger development.

Chengdu Greenland Tower's architecture and structure are married perfectly. The design fully considers the structural requirements of a supertall building in a high seismic zone, using a geometrical plan, a tapered form, and a high-performance damper bracing system to ensure the structure's stability and efficiency. The building also features an allotment of high-efficiency sustainability systems, including high-performance glass paneling on the exterior.

Office space totaling 120,000 square meters will be situated in the lower part of the tower where the floors are largest, with a 51,000 square-meter luxury hotel in the middle. At the top, where space is at a premium, there will be 42,000 square meters of executive hosting space.

See also
List of tallest buildings in China
List of buildings with 100 floors or more

References

Skyscrapers in Chengdu
Buildings and structures under construction in China
Skyscraper office buildings in China
Skyscraper hotels in China